Mormyrus is a genus of ray-finned fish in the family Mormyridae.

Species 

There are currently 22 recognized species in this genus:

 Mormyrus bernhardi Pellegrin 1926 (Bernhard's elephant-snout fish)
 Mormyrus caballus Boulenger 1898
 Mormyrus caballus asinus Boulenger, 1915
 Mormyrus caballus bumbanus Boulenger 1909
 Mormyrus caballus caballus Boulenger 1898
 Mormyrus caballus lualabae Reizer 1964
 Mormyrus casalis Vinciguerra 1922 (Somali mormyrid)
 Mormyrus caschive Linnaeus 1758 (Eastern bottlenose elephant snout)
 Mormyrus cyaneus T. R. Roberts & D. J. Stewart 1976 (Lower Congo River mormyrid)
 Mormyrus felixi Pellegrin 1939
 Mormyrus goheeni Fowler 1919 (Liberian mormyrid)
 Mormyrus hasselquistii Valenciennes 1847 (Elephant snout)
 Mormyrus hildebrandti W. K. H. Peters 1882 (Hildebrandt's elephant-snout fish)
 Mormyrus iriodes T. R. Roberts & D. J. Stewart 1976 (Inga mormyrid)
 Mormyrus kannume Forsskål 1775 (Elephant-snout fish)
 Mormyrus lacerda Castelnau 1861 (Western bottlenose mormyrid)
 Mormyrus longirostris W. K. H. Peters 1852 (Eastern bottlenose mormyrid)
 Mormyrus macrocephalus Worthington 1929 (largehead mormyrid)
 Mormyrus macrophthalmus Günther 1866 (Niger mormyrid)
 Mormyrus niloticus (Bloch & J. G. Schneider 1801) (Egyptian trunkfish)
 Mormyrus ovis Boulenger 1898
 Mormyrus rume Valenciennes 1847 (Senegal mormyrid)
 Mormyrus rume proboscirostris Boulenger 1898
 Mormyrus rume rume Valenciennes 1847 
 Mormyrus subundulatus T. R. Roberts 1989 (Bandama mormyrid)
 Mormyrus tapirus Pappenheim 1905
 Mormyrus tenuirostris W. K. H. Peters 1882 (Athi elephant-snout fish)
 Mormyrus thomasi Pellegrin 1938 (French Congo mormyrid)

References 

 
Taxa named by Carl Linnaeus
Taxonomy articles created by Polbot
Ray-finned fish genera